Ruadh Stac Mor or Ruadh-Stac Mòr (Gaelic) is a mountain with a height of  in the Northwest Highlands of Scotland. It is located in the Dundonnell and Fisherfield Forest in  Wester Ross.

One of the remotest Munros in Scotland, it provides superb views from its summit. Climbs generally start from the village of Poolewe to the west.

References

Mountains and hills of the Northwest Highlands
Marilyns of Scotland
Munros